Vinícius Oliveira Franco, or simply Vinícius (born May 16, 1986) is a Brazilian footballer who plays for Nea Salamina in the Cypriot First Division as a central midfielder.

Career

Portugal
Vinícius moved abroad for the first time in 2004 to join Portuguese club FC Porto B. During his eight-year spell in Portugal he played also for C.D. Nacional, União da Madeira, C.D. Aves, S.C. Olhanense, S.C. Braga and Moreirense.

APOEL
On 10 July 2013, after eight seasons in the Portuguese leagues, Vinícius signed a two-year contract with APOEL FC from Cyprus. He made his official debut on 17 August 2013 against Apollon Limassol in the Cypriot Super Cup final, in a match which APOEL won 1–0 and lifted the trophy. He scored his first official goal for APOEL on 2 September 2013, in his team's 3–0 home win against Enosis Neon Paralimni for the Cypriot First Division. During the 2013–14 season, he appeared in all six 2013–14 UEFA Europa League group stage matches for APOEL and also managed to win all the titles in Cyprus, the Cypriot League, the Cypriot Cup and the Cypriot Super Cup.

On 20 August 2014, Vinícius scored the equalizer against Aalborg BK at Nordjyske Arena, in APOEL's 1–1 first leg draw for the play-off round of the UEFA Champions League. On 26 August 2014, he scored again in the return leg against Aalborg BK, helping his team to win 4–0 and reach the group stage of the UEFA Champions League. Vinícius appeared in every group stage match in APOEL's 2014–15 UEFA Champions League campaign. On 6 December 2014, Vinícius signed a two-year contract extension with APOEL, running until June 2017.

On 15 September 2016, he scored the equalizer in APOEL's 2–1 home victory over FC Astana for the group stage of the UEFA Europa League. On 19 May 2017, Vinícius signed a two-year contract extension with APOEL, running until June 2019.

Olympiakos Nicosia
On 5 September 2019 he signed for Olympiakos Nicosia.

Career statistics

Honours
APOEL
Cypriot First Division: 2013–14, 2014–15, 2015–16, 2016–17
Cypriot Cup: 2013–14, 2014–15
Cypriot Super Cup: 2013

References

External links
APOEL official profile

1986 births
Living people
Brazilian footballers
Association football midfielders
Brazilian expatriate footballers
Primeira Liga players
Persian Gulf Pro League players
Cypriot First Division players
FC Porto B players
C.D. Nacional players
C.F. União players
C.D. Aves players
S.C. Olhanense players
S.C. Braga players
Moreirense F.C. players
APOEL FC players
Sanat Naft Abadan F.C. players
Olympiakos Nicosia players
Brazilian expatriate sportspeople in Portugal
Brazilian expatriate sportspeople in Iran
Brazilian expatriate sportspeople in Cyprus
Expatriate footballers in Portugal
Expatriate footballers in Iran
Expatriate footballers in Cyprus
People from Campo Grande
Sportspeople from Mato Grosso do Sul